Gina Marissa Tagasa-Gil (also credited as Gina Marissa Tagasa) is a Filipino television writer and film writer. She is a former resident writer for ABS-CBN Corporation and currently, a resident writer for GMA Network.

Filmography

Creator
 Magpahanggang Wakas (2016–17)
 Tubig at Langis (2016)
 Two Wives (2014–15)
 Maria Mercedes (2013–14)
 Valiente (2012) (as lyrics)
 Pieta (2008–09)
 Dyosa (2008)

Writer/Headwriter/ Creative Manager
 Magpakailanman (2018, 2019)
 Dear Uge (2018, 2019)
 Ang Forever Ko'y Ikaw (2018)
 Kung Mahawi Man Ang Ulap (2007)
   Pieta
   Nasaan Ka,Elisa?
   Maria Mercedes
   Two Wives
   Tubig at Langis
   Kwento ni Lola Basyang
 Marinara (2004)
 Ang Iibigin Ay Ikaw (2002)
  GMA Telesine
 Sa Puso Ko, Iingatan Ka (2001)
 Labs Ko Si Babe (1999–2000)
 Lovingly Yours, Helen (1984)
  Coney Reyes on Camera
  Maricel Soriano Drama Special
  Valiente
  Agila
  Heredero

Film
"The Heiress" (2019)
 One Great Love (2018)
 Mama's Girl (2018)
 Hide and Seek (2007)
 Angels (2007)
 Eternity (2006)
 Moments of Love (2006)
 Kislap Sa Dilim (1991)
  "Kung Aagawin Mo ang Lahat sa Akin"
  "Kung Tapos na ang Kailanman"
. "Isusumbong Kita sa Diyos"
  Nakagapos na Puso (1986)
 Natutulog Pa Ang Diyos (1989)

External links 
 

Filipino dramatists and playwrights
Filipino screenwriters
Year of birth missing (living people)
Living people
ABS-CBN people
Women dramatists and playwrights
20th-century dramatists and playwrights
21st-century dramatists and playwrights
20th-century Filipino writers
21st-century Filipino writers
20th-century Filipino women writers
21st-century Filipino women writers